Stephen Rochford (born 10 October 1978) is an Irish Gaelic football coach and former manager and player. He was manager of the senior Mayo county team from 2015 to 2018.

Raised in Crossmolina, County Mayo, Rochford was educated at Crossmolina Boys' National School and Gortnor Abbey. He was introduced to football by primary school teacher John Cosgrove and Crossmolina coach Tom McNulty. He won Connacht School titles for Gortnor Abbey, playing under Gerry Leonard. He simultaneously came to prominence at juvenile and underage levels with the Crossmolina team, winning a county under-21 championship medal in 1997. By this stage Rochford had joined the Crossmolina senior team and won an All-Ireland medal in 2001. He also won three Connacht medals and six County Senior Championship medals.

Rochford made his debut on the inter-county scene at the age of sixteen when he first linked up with the Mayo minor team. A Connacht medal winner as captain of the team in 1996, he subsequently joined the Mayo under-21 team. Rochford made his senior debut during the 1999-00 league and spent one season with the team.

While still a player, Rochford began his coaching and managerial career when he served as a Mayo minor selector for two seasons. After finishing the year as All-Ireland runners-up in 2005, he later coached the Mayo under-21 team to an All-Ireland B title in 2007. After a period working with the Mayo-Galway IT Team in the Sigerson Cup, he managed Corofin to the All-Ireland title in 2015. Rochford was appointed manager of the Mayo senior team in November 2015.

Early life
Rochford grew up in the St Patrick's Avenue area of Crossmolina in County Mayo, Ireland, where he was educated at Crossmolina Boys' National School and Gortnor Abbey Secondary School. He represented Mayo as a minor, winning a Connacht championship in 1996, as captain.

Rochford can be seen as a young boy in the Crossmolina Deel Rovers video by Tom McNulty on YouTube.

Personal life
Rochford is a bank manager for AIB in Castlerea.

Playing career

Rochford came through the Crossmolina Deel Rovers system alongside Ciarán McDonald, Peadár Gardiner and Sigerson Cup winner Michael Moyles, and was part of the talented Crossmolina team that won six County titles between 1995 and 2006.

Rochford won an All-Ireland club Championship medal with Crossmolina in 2001 and a runners-up medal in 2003.

Management career
Rochford began coaching Junior Crossmolina and Mayo teams, experiencing success.

Rochford managed Galway club Corofin to the All-Ireland club Championship in 2015, becoming the first man to win All-Ireland club football medals as both a player and a manager with different clubs.

Mayo Bainisteoir
Rochford was named as the new Bainisteoir of the Mayo senior football team in December 2015 for a three-year spell.

Within a year, Rochford had led the Mayo team to the 2016 All-Ireland Senior Football Championship Final against Dublin, where the first final ended in a draw. Rochford's men lost the reply by a point in a very close encounter.

In the 2017 All-Ireland semi-final, Mayo played Kerry. Rochford's men drew the game. In the replay Mayo overwhelmed Kerry by 2-16 to 0-17, earning a second All-Ireland SFC final appearance for Mayo under Rochford within two years of his taking over as Mayo Bainisteoir. In that game, Rochford's Mayo team again lost out by a single point against Dublin.

In June 2018, Rochford's Mayo lost to Kildare by a scoreline of 0-21 - 0-19 in the All-Ireland SFC Third Round, which was the first time in eight years that Mayo lost a game in the back-door. On 27 August 2018, Rochford resigned as Mayo manager.

Since
Bernard Flynn named Rochford as part of his backroom team as Meath manager as he prepared to succeed Andy McEntee in 2022, then Colm O'Rourke was appointed manager instead. Flynn deleted a tweet about Rochford. Shortly after this, Rochford was named as part of Kevin McStay's bid for the senior Mayo managerial vacancy. McStay's bid was successful, so Rochford returned to Mayo in August 2022. McStay named him as his assistant manager and coach.

References

 

1978 births
Living people
Allied Irish Banks people
All-Ireland Senior Club Football Championship winning managers
Gaelic football coaches
Gaelic football managers
Gaelic football selectors
People educated at Gortnor Abbey
People from Crossmolina